Blastobasis beo is a moth in the  family Blastobasidae. It is found in Costa Rica.

The length of the forewings is 4.9–5.8 mm. The forewings are pale brown intermixed with brown scales. The hindwings are translucent pale brown.

Etymology
The specific name is derived from Latin beo (meaning to bless or enrich).

References

Moths described in 2013
Blastobasis